This is a list of public art in Victoria, a district in the City of Westminster, London.

Victoria is roughly described as the area around Victoria station. It includes the conservation areas of Broadway and Christchurch Gardens, Grosvenor Gardens and the environs of Westminster Cathedral. Particularly noteworthy examples of architectural sculpture can be found at 55 Broadway, where in 1928–1929 sculptors including Eric Gill and Henry Moore were engaged on representations of the Four Winds; two further figures, Night and Day, were carved by Jacob Epstein. A great deal of public art by recent graduates of art schools in London was incorporated into Cardinal Place, a development of 2005.

55 Broadway

References

Bibliography

 

 

 

 

 

 

 

Victoria
Public art